Jacinto Vásquez (born January 4, 1944 in Panama) is a retired Hall of Fame thoroughbred jockey. He rode two Kentucky Derby winners, Foolish Pleasure in 1975 and the filly Genuine Risk in 1980. He was also the regular jockey for the champion filly Ruffian.

Biography
Vasquez began working at the Presidente Remon Racetrack in Panama at age 15, and became a leading apprentice rider there before moving to the United States in 1960. He was based in New York for much of his career, and also frequently rode at Calder Race Course in Florida.

During his career  Vasquez was the only jockey to defeat Secretariat three times: in the Wood Memorial with Angle Light,  in the Whitney Handicap aboard Onion, and in Secretariat's maiden race aboard Quebec.

In 1975, Vasquez was the regular jockey for both Kentucky Derby winner Foolish Pleasure and Triple Tiara winner Ruffian.  When "The Great match race" was set on July 6, 1975 between the two horses was arranged, Vasquez chose to ride Ruffian, leaving Foolish Pleasure for Braulio Baeza.

Beginning in February 1984, Jacinto Vasquez served a one-year suspension for attempting to bribe another jockey, a charge going back to 1975 which he vehemently denied and had fought through racing authority hearings and through the courts for nearly ten years.

Vasquez was the leading jockey at Calder five times, in the seasons ending in 1973, 1974, 1980, 1981, and 1991.  Over his 37-year career, he raced 37,392 times, winning 14% of his races.  When he retired in 1996, he was 15th on the all-time wins list for jockeys.  He was elected to the National Museum of Racing and Hall of Fame in 1998 and the Calder Hall of Fame in 1999.

Since retiring as a jockey, Jacinto Vasquez has remained in racing and is now training horses in Ocala, Florida.

References

 National Racing Hall of Fame biography
 Calder Race Course biography
 Gene Smith, "Ruffian", American Heritage, September 1993
 "Surgery for Vasquez", New York Times, February 26, 1994 (source for birthdate)

Living people
1944 births
Panamanian jockeys
American jockeys
United States Thoroughbred Racing Hall of Fame inductees
Panamanian emigrants to the United States